Kamarcheh-ye Olya (also Romanized as Kamarcheh-ye ‘Olyā) is a village in Jolgeh-ye Musaabad Rural District, in the Central District of Torbat-e Jam County, Razavi Khorasan Province, Iran. At the 2006 census, its population was 84, in 17 families.

References 

Populated places in Torbat-e Jam County